Gjesvær Chapel is a chapel of the Church of Norway in Nordkapp Municipality in Troms og Finnmark county, Norway. It is located in the village of Gjesvær on the western end of the island of Magerøya. It is an annex chapel for the Nordkapp parish which is part of the Hammerfest prosti (deanery) in the Diocese of Nord-Hålogaland. The white, wooden chapel was built in a long church style in 1960 and it is privately owned. The church seats about 70 people.

The church is registered in the Norwegian cultural heritage monument database.

Media gallery

See also
List of churches in Nord-Hålogaland

References

Nordkapp
Churches in Finnmark
Wooden churches in Norway
20th-century Church of Norway church buildings
Churches completed in 1960
1960 establishments in Norway
Long churches in Norway